The Congregation for Borders (Congregazione dei Confini) was a congregation of the Roman Curia. It was set up by Pope Urban VIII in his apostolic constitution Debitum pastoralis officii on 1 October 1627 to oversee the borders of the Papal States. It was suppressed in 1847.

1627 establishments in the Papal States
1847 disestablishments in the Papal States
Congregations of the Roman Curia
Former departments of the Roman Curia
Pope Urban VIII